Attas Cabinet was the first cabinet of Yemen after Yemeni Unification in 1990. it was formed by Haidar Abu Bakr al-Attas from 24 May 1990 to 29 May 1994. It was made up of 40 ministers.

List of ministers

See also 

 Politics of Yemen

References 

Cabinets of Yemen
1990 establishments in Yemen
Attas Cabinet